The Last Patrol may refer to:

another title of The Last Warrior (2000 film)
"The Last Patrol", an episode of the miniseries Band of Brothers
"The Last Patrol", an episode of the animated television series Batman: The Brave and the Bold

See also
The Lost Patrol (disambiguation)